RNA transcription, translation and transport factor is a protein that in humans is encoded by the RTRAF gene.

References

Further reading

Human proteins